Damn Near Righteous is an album from Bill Medley, produced by Steve Dorff and Shayne Fair. The album was released on a limited basis on September 25, 2007 but was rereleased worldwide by Varèse Sarabande and distributed by Universal Music on November 11, 2014.  The album was completed four years after Bobby Hatfield, Bill's former partner in The Righteous Brothers died.

Songs 
The album features a mixture of new and old songs (with cover versions of Ray Charles' "Lonely Avenue" and Brian Wilson's "In My Room"), and includes musicians such as Brian Wilson and Phil Everly. Medley gave a twist to several of the songs.

 Made Earl King's "Trick Bag" more upbeat
 Stripped down Bob Dylan's song "Just Like a Woman" to be paired with only a bluesy piano
 Paired the harmonious voices Brian Wilson, and the late Phil Everly of the Everly Brothers on The Beach Boys' "In My Room". 
 Closed the album with "California Goodbye," written by the producers, paying final respects to Bobby Hatfield

Track listing 
 "Sit Down & Hurt" – 3:44
 "Trick Bag" – 4:11
 "Something Blue" – 3:59
 "Lonely Avenue	" – 3:34
 "In My Room" – 3:39
 "Hurt City" – 3:48
 "Just Like a Woman" – 4:50
 "I'll Find Someone Who Will" – 4:50
 "Beautiful" – 3:27
 "Two Lives" – 3:56
 "Rock My Baby" – 3:48
 "California Goodbye" – 3:47
 "Blue Denim Blues" – 3:25

Personnel 
Dean Parks 
Vinnie Colaiuta 
J.R. Robinson
Joe Chemay 
Jimmy Nichols 
McKenna Medley  
Jeffrey Foskett

References

External links 

2007 albums
Bill Medley albums